Amer Abdel-Karim Radhi Abu Hwaiti is a retired Jordanian footballer of Palestinian origin.

International goals

References
 Amer Abu Hwaiti: "I Feel Injustice in Al-Wahdat SC...However, I Will Not Play in any Other Club Locally!" 
 Abu Hwaiti Officially Transfers to Manshia Bani Hassan

External links 
 

1989 births
Living people
Jordanian footballers
Jordanian people of Palestinian descent
Association football forwards
Jordanian Pro League players
Jordan international footballers
Al-Wehdat SC players
Mansheyat Bani Hasan players
Sahab SC players
Ittihad Al-Ramtha players
Sportspeople from Amman